The Burwell School is an American historic site and former school, located in Hillsborough, North Carolina.  It is listed on the National Register of Historic Places and located in the Hillsborough Historic District.

History
The house was first built in 1821 by Captain John Berry, a carpenter in the area. In 1835, Reverend Robert Burwell, his wife, Margaret Anna Burwell, and his two oldest children, Mary and John Bott, moved into the home after the Hillsborough Presbyterian Church bought the property to serve as a parsonage. Living with them was their slave Elizabeth Keckly (then Hobbes), who would as a free woman be known for her association with First Lady Mary Todd Lincoln.

Two years later, James Webb approached Mrs. Burwell and asked her to educate his daughters. She agreed, and opened a school for young ladies in her home. The school ran from 1837 to 1857, and enrolled more than 200 girls over those twenty years. In 1848, the Burwells hired the home's original builder to expand the home after they purchased it from the church. After Reverend Burwell left his position with the church, he joined the school's teaching staff, which also included several graduates of the program. The Burwell School remained open for 20 years before they shifted their attention to founding a women's college in Charlotte, North Carolina, that evolved to become Queens University of Charlotte.

In the years that followed, two notable families lived on the site: the Collins family from Edenton, North Carolina, and the Spurgeon Family, who were descendants of one of the Burwells' students. In 1964, the Historic Hillsborough Commission bought the property from the Spurgeon family and restored it to appear historically accurate for the antebellum period. The site is open to the public for tours and events.

See also

 1821 in architecture

References

External links 
 burwellschool.org, Burwell School Historic Site's official website

1837 establishments in North Carolina
1857 disestablishments in North Carolina
Houses completed in 1821
Defunct schools in North Carolina
Educational institutions established in 1837
Federal architecture in North Carolina
Former school buildings in the United States
Houses on the National Register of Historic Places in North Carolina
Museums in Orange County, North Carolina
Organizations disestablished in the 19th century
Clergy houses in the United States
Schools in Orange County, North Carolina
Hillsborough, North Carolina
National Register of Historic Places in Orange County, North Carolina
Houses in Orange County, North Carolina
Individually listed contributing properties to historic districts on the National Register in North Carolina